Jairam Jatav is an Indian politician from the Bharatiya Janata Party and a member of the Rajasthan Legislative Assembly representing the Alwar Rural Vidhan Sabha constituency of Rajasthan.

References 

Bharatiya Janata Party politicians from Rajasthan
1955 births
Living people